The 2012 USL Pro season was the 26th season of third-division soccer in the United States, and the second season of USL Pro.
The season started with 11 teams. FC New York self-relegated to the National Premier Soccer League prior to the release of the schedule. The final weekend of the regular season was August 17–19.

Teams

Stadiums and Locations

Personal and Kits

Note: Flags indicate national team as has been defined under FIFA eligibility rules. Players and Managers may hold more than one non-FIFA nationality.

Transfers
For full list, see List of USL Pro transfers 2012.

Standings

Results table

USL Pro published schedule and results.

Playoffs
The 2012 USL Pro Playoffs included the top six finishers in the table, with the No. 1 and No. 2 seeds receiving a first-round bye on August 25. The semifinals featuring the four remaining teams was played the following weekend, with the 2012 USL PRO Championship set for the weekend of September 7–9. All playoff rounds featured a single-game knockout format.

Championship Game MVP: Jose Cuevas (CHB)

Statistical leaders

Top scorers

Source:

Top assists

Source:

|}

Top Goalkeepers
(Minimum of 1080 Minutes Played)

Source:

League awards

 Most Valuable Player:  Kevin Molino (ORL)
 Rookie of the Year: Jose Cuevas (CHB)
 Defender of the Year:  Troy Roberts (ROC)
 Goalkeeper of the Year: Kristian Nicht (ROC)
 Coach of the Year: Adrian Heath (ORL)

All-League Teams

First Team
F: Dennis Chin (ORL), Jose Cuevas (CHB), Corey Hertzog (WIL)
M: J.C. Banks (ROC), Kevin Molino (ORL), Nicki Paterson (CHB)
D: Josh Rife (CHE), Troy Roberts (ROC),  Rob Valentino (ORL), William Yomby (RIC)
G: Kristian Nicht (ROC)

Second Team
F: Bright Dike (LAB), Matt Luzunaris (ORL), Lucky Mkosana (HAR)
M: Joel DeLass (DDL), Matt Kassel (PIT), Bryce Taylor (WIL)
D: Kieron Bernard (ORL), Erlys Garcia (LAB),  Quentin Griffith (ANT), Jerome Mechack (ORL)
G: Miguel Gallardo (ORL)

References

 
2012
3
2012–13 in Antigua and Barbuda football
2013–14 in Antigua and Barbuda football